Kissing gouramis, also known as kissing fish or kissers (Helostoma temminckii), are medium-sized tropical freshwater fish comprising the monotypic labyrinth fish family Helostomatidae (from the Greek elos [stud, nail], stoma [mouth]). These fish originate from Mainland Southeast Asia, Greater Sundas and nearby smaller islands, but have also been introduced outside their native range. They are regarded as a food fish and they are sometimes farmed. They are used fresh for steaming, baking, broiling, and pan frying. The kissing gourami is a popular aquarium fish.

Description 

Typical of gourami, the body is deep and strongly compressed laterally. The long-based dorsal (16–18 spinous rays, 13–16 soft) and anal fins (13–15 spinous rays, 17–19 soft) mirror each other in length and frame the body. The posterior most soft rays of each of these fins are slightly elongated to create a trailing margin. The foremost rays of the jugular pelvic fins are also slightly elongated. The pectoral fins are large, rounded, and low-slung. The caudal fin is rounded to concave. The lateral line is divided in two, with the posterior portion starting below the end of the other; there are a total of 43–48 scales running the line's length.

The most distinctive feature of the kissing gourami is its mouth. Other than being terminal (forward-facing) rather than superior (upward-facing) as in other gourami families, the kissing gourami's mouth is highly protrusible as its family name suggests, the lips are lined with horny teeth. However, teeth are absent from the premaxilla, dentaries, palatine, and pharynx. The gill rakers are also well-developed and numerous. The visible scales of the body are ctenoid, whereas the scales of the top of the head are cycloid. There is no outward sexual dimorphism and is difficult to almost impossible to distinguish the sexes.

Two colour morphs are encountered: greenish-silvery, which have lengthwise spotty stripes on the body and opaque, dark brown fins; and pink, which have a rose to orangy pink body and silvery scales, with transparent pinkish fins. While it has been claimed that the greenish fish originate from Thailand and pinkish fish originate from Java, the greenish is the wild form and the pinkish is a man-made leucistic form.

Jaw and mouth 
It is important to emphasize the particularity that this species has in its mouth: it has an additional joint between its jaw and the rest of the joints, known as intramandibular joint. This type of joint is also present in other species of fish that feed on nutrients attached to the substrate. By increasing the angle of opening of the jaw, this joint allows kissing gourami access to these nutrients. H. temminkii, however, is the only species known that uses this articulation in this way.

The intramandibular joint divides the jaw into two independent elements so that it increases the degrees of freedom and the potential number of ways of getting food. This articulation, although its mechanism and anatomy are still being studied, results in an adaptation of H. temminkii and its feeding.

Habitat and ecology
Shallow, slow-moving, and thickly vegetated backwaters are the kissing gourami's natural habitat. They are midwater omnivores that primarily graze on benthic algae and aquatic plants, with insects taken from the surface. They are also filter feeders, using their many gill rakers to supplement their diet with plankton. The fish use their toothed lips to rasp algae from stones and other surfaces. This rasping action, which (to humans) looks superficially like kissing, is also used by males to challenge the dominancy of conspecifics.

Intraspecific behaviour 
The kissing gourami present a kind of behavior associated with their characteristic jaw and mouth: two individuals approach their mouths in both mediolateral and dorsoventral planes and press for a few seconds. This type of "kiss" has given H. temminkii the common name of kissing gourami. This has been considered an intraspecific aggressive behavior also known as "mouth fight" due to the contraction of the jaw muscles. However, it is not completely confirmed that it is an aggressive behavior and is rather understood as a ritualized form of aggression.

Ecosystem roles 
Helostoma temminkii can become the host to some parasitic algal species. These algae are able to survive under kissing gourami skin and look like color spots. Some hypothesis affirm that these algae communities receive some nutrients required for photosynthesis from the H. temminkii. The individuals which have these parasites in their bodies are commonly less healthy than those which have not any algae parasites.

H. temminkii are able to communicate  between each other due to their complex inner ear: it has a suprabranchial air-breathing chamber which gives these fishes the capacity to modulate their hearing through air bubbles in this area. Kissing gouramis are also able to emit sounds to other individuals of their own species through the movement of their teeth.

Reproduction 
Helostoma temminkii are oviparous and dioecious and have external fertilization. Spawning occurs from May to October in Thailand, at the beginning of the rainy season. Kissing gouramis are open-water egg scatterers; spawning is initiated by the female and takes place under cover of floating vegetation. The eggs, which the adults do not guard, are spherical, smooth, and buoyant. Initial development is rapid: the eggs hatch after one day, and the fry are free-swimming two days thereafter. The kissing gourami does not care for its young.  Adults migrate through the rivers to shallow lagoons or into flooded forests to spawn. A female starts mating and the male simultaneously shed the eggs and sperm to the outside. Females release an average of 1000 eggs. The eggs are spherical and small compared to other freshwater species and have a drop of oil to increase buoyancy. Fertilized eggs float to the surface and usually bind to floating vegetation, becoming larvae. Biting fish reach sexual maturity of three to five years.

Feeding 
The kissing gourami is an omnivorous microphagic filtering fish, whose nutrition is based on a wide variety of food sources, such as insects, algae, larvae from other species and other microorganisms found on submerged species. The mouth, teeth, gills and especially the intramandibular joint described above make this fish a very well adapted species: it is able to find nutrients in places where other species  cannot be such as algal-covered surfaces.

In the aquarium 

Kissing gouramis are also popular with aquarists for the fish's peculiar "kissing" behavior of other fish, plants, and other objects. Kissers of both sexes will often spar by meeting mouths and pushing each other through the water. Large quantities of these fish are exported to Japan, Europe, North America, Australia, and other parts of the world for just this reason. Kissing gouramis need a roomy tank to thrive; they grow rapidly, and juvenile fish will quickly outgrow smaller aquaria. Kissing gouramis are territorial; some are tolerant towards fish of similar size, but others will bully, chase, and torment, causing significant stress on tank mates. Male kissers will occasionally challenge each other; however, the "kissing" itself is never fatal, but the constant bullying can stress the other fish to death. They often do in fact kill other fish by sucking the mucus off their skin as food, which opens the victim fish up to infections. These fish may be useful as algae eaters to control algae growth. To prevent digging and to present enough surface area for algae growth, the substrate should consist of large-diameter gravel and stones. The aquarium's back glass should not be cleaned during regular maintenance, as the gouramis will feed on the algae grown there. Most plants will not survive the fish's grazing, so inedible plants such as Java fern, Java moss, or plastic plants are recommended.

These fish are omnivorous and need both plant and animal matter in their diets. The fish will accept vegetables such as cooked lettuce and any kind of live food. When breeding kissing gouramis, soft water is preferred. As the fish do not build nests, lettuce leaves placed on the water surface serve as a spawning medium. The lettuce will eventually host bacteria and infusoria upon which the fish will feed. Kissing Gourami are also a very long lived fish, a long term commitment for the fish keeper. They have been known to live in excess of 25 years (*).

In the aquarium, breeders have also produced a "dwarf" or "balloon pink" variety, which is a mutated strain of the pink gourami that are offered to hobbyists. The "balloons" are named so for their smaller and rounder bodies.

Lifespan 
In captivity and in the wild the average lifespan is 5 to 7 years, but it is known that kissing gourami can live much longer.

See also
 List of fish families

References 

Baensch, Hans A., and Riehl, Rudiger. (1997) Baensch Aquarium Atlas, Vol. 1. (6th ed.), p. 652. Microcosm Ltd.; Shelburne, Vermont. 
 Kissing Gourami (Helostoma temminckii), Kmuda http://www.oscarfish.com/fish/81-all-about-fish/166-kissing-gourami-helostoma-temminckii.html
Sterba, G. 1983. The Aquarium Fish Encyclopedia. Cambridge, MA: The MIT Press.

Helostomatidae
Anabantiformes
Fish of Southeast Asia
Fish of Thailand
Fish described in 1829
Taxa named by Georges Cuvier